The Cobblers' Bridge or the Shoemakers' Bridge ( or ) is a pedestrian bridge crossing the river Ljubljanica in Ljubljana, the capital of Slovenia. It connects two major areas of medieval Ljubljana. It is decorated by two kinds of pillars, the Corinthian pillars which delineate the shape of the bridge itself and the Ionic pillars as lamp-bearers.

History
It is one of the oldest bridges crossing the river in Ljubljana, and dates back to at least the 13th century. In the Middle Ages it was known as the Upper Bridge. It started as a wooden bridge with a butchers shop on it, but the stench from the meat was so strong that the Emperor at the time paid to have them relocated. Shoemakers were the new occupiers of their booths, so the bridge gained its present name. The bridge has been reconstructed on numerous occasions throughout its long history due to floods or fires, and in 1867 a cast-iron bridge, named Hradecky Bridge after a former mayor of Ljubljana, was built and later relocated.

Stone Bridge
The current stone bridge was designed in 1931 by the architect Jože Plečnik. In 2010, a monument of Ivan Hribar, mayor of Ljubljana between 1895 and 1907, was unveiled next to the bridge.

References

Bridges in Ljubljana
Pedestrian bridges in Slovenia
Bridges completed in 1931
Stone bridges
Jože Plečnik buildings
Bridges over the Ljubljanica
Center District, Ljubljana
Art Nouveau architecture in Ljubljana
Art Nouveau bridges
20th-century architecture in Slovenia